Wardija is a hamlet in St. Paul's Bay, Malta, about 363 feet above sea level. Its name is corrupted from the Sicilian or Italian word , meaning 'to watch'). Although the name of the hamlet has Arabic lexicons, it was probably named later when Maltese, then an Arabic dialect, remained a dominant language. The hamlet is bordered with Bidnija, Buġibba, San Martin and Pwales. Several archeological remains are found in the whereabouts, proving that it was inhabited in pre-history and the Roman period, and it has always been mainly a rural village. From the 16th till the 18th-centuries it saw a shift into a hunting zone with the construction of several hunting lodges and chapels.

A number of knights and noble families built their country residences, originally to be used for hunting and retreats. A number of 19th and 20th century structures were also erected in the area. Some houses are still owned by the descendants of the original builders, while others are now used for multiple purposes such as private homes, commercial accommodation, events and weddings receptions. There are two schools, one for local students and one for foreign students.

There are a number of public and private chapels dating from the rule of the Order of St. John till the 20th century. Some houses have buttressed walls, possibly for defense purposes or general support, while other have defense features exclusively for decorative intent. A World War I battery was constructed in the whereabouts of Wardija, and its gun emplacements are still on site. A rental complex, known as the Wardija Hilltop Village, and the Headquarters of the Ecumenical Order, known as Castello Dei Baroni, are located at the inner part of Wardija.

Wardija consist of a low and high land, its hill is a plateau, and Qannotta Valley is located within its boundaries. Rain water in Wardija is vital for agriculture, as a primary source of production, while it also flows into areas around such as to the now defunct Xemxija Aqueduct. Some lands in Wardija enjoy a conservation status from the Environment and Resources Authority, while there are also pre-historic cart-ruts enjoying conservation from the Planning Authority.

Buildings

Notable residences
There are three Roman period villas at Wardija, all of which are in ruins.

Wardija has a concentration of historic country residences.

Casino Mifsud
Casa Navarra
Casa Manduca
Is-Sienja, formerly known as Casa Sant Manduca (built 17th century) (Advance Dressing Station)
Castel Bertrand
Casa San Antonio, or Palazz tat-Telgha (Uphill Palace)
Qannotta Castle, or Palazz Qannotta
Castello tas-Salvatur
Palazzo Busietta
Castello Dei Baroni
Palazz ta' Gerxija
Palazzo Promotorio
Dar San Frangisk
La Verna House
Villa Rosa Mundi
Rihana, a villa with top-of-the-line design. A highly architectural masterpiece.

Churches and chapels
Wardija has a large concentration of churches and chapels.
St. George Chapel, Wardija
Church of Our Lady, or Our Lady of the Abandoned Church
Immaculate Conception Chapel, Wardija
Our Lady of Graces, or Tal-Imrieha Chapel
St. John the Baptist Chapel, Wardija, or Tal-Hereb Chapel
St. Martin Chapel, Wardija
St. Nicholas Chapel, Wardija
St. Simon Chapel, Wardija
Chapel at Castello dei Baroni
Chapel with an unknown dedication

Other buildings and structures
Rezul Lodge
Albizia Lodge
Wild Rose
Maria Regina College and Young Adult Education Resource Centre
Wardija Battery
Wardija Hilltop Village
Dar tal-Argentier

See also
Bidnija
Buġibba
Pwales
Xemxija
St. Paul's Bay

References

Populated places in Malta
St. Paul's Bay